Coy Cronk (born January 18, 1998) is an American football offensive tackle for the Jacksonville Jaguars of the National Football League (NFL). He played college football for Indiana and for Iowa.

Professional career

Green Bay Packers
Cronk signed with the Green Bay Packers as an undrafted free agent but was released before the start of the 2021 season.

Jacksonville Jaguars
Cronk was signed by the Jacksonville Jaguars on October 22, 2021 but didn't make his debut until the 2022–23 season in a Week 16 win against the New York Jets. He was also elevated to the active roster for the Jaguars playoff game against the Los Angeles Chargers. He signed a reserve/future contract on January 23, 2023.

References

External links
Iowa Hawkeyes bio
Indiana Hoosiers bio

1998 births
Living people
Sportspeople from Lafayette, Indiana
Players of American football from Indiana
American football tackles
Iowa Hawkeyes football players
Indiana Hoosiers football players
Jacksonville Jaguars players